Callirhipidae is a family of beetles, found widely throughout low-latitude regions except tropical Africa and Madagascar. There are around 175 species in 7 genera. The larvae bore into dead wood and generally have a long life span of 2 or more years. The adults are generally nocturnal.

Genera
There are currently seven recognised genera in Callirhipidae.

 Brachyrrhipis van Emden, 1931
 Callirhipis Latreille, 1829
 subgenus Ennometidium Emden, 1929
 subgenus Helleriola Emden, 1934
 subgenus Parennometes Emden, 1931
 Celadonia Laporte de Castelnau, 1840
 synonym: Simianides Emden, 1924
 Ennometes Pascoe, 1866
 Ptorthocera Champion, 1896
 Simianus Blanchard, 1853 
 synonyms: Homoeorhipis Fairmaire, 1887, Horatocera Lewis, 1895, Simianellus Emden, 1924
 Zenoa Say, 1835

References

Further reading

External links

 

 
Byrrhoidea
Polyphaga families